The Plymouth CR-8 was a class of 4-axle B'B' centre cab locomotive, built by Plymouth Locomotive Works, USA

Several locomotives of type CR-8 have been used in the USA on industrial sites.

Ten units (CR-8b) were briefly operated in Thailand in the mid-1960s. During the Vietnam War the units were operated by the US Army in South Vietnam, and after the end of the war became the property of the Vietnam Railways as class D10H.

A second class of Chinese-built locomotives of type DFH21 have operated as the type D10H on the railways of Vietnam from around 1980 onwards.

History and design

The locomotives used in Vietnam were built by the Plymouth Locomotive Works, USA in the 1960s using two General Motors 12V71 two stroke V12 engines. They were in  gauge.

The locomotives were originally thought to have been operated on the Royal State Railways of Siam (RSR) as numbers 2001-2010 beginning in 1963 or 1964. The locomotives were transferred to South Vietnam in the late 1960s during the period of US involvement in the Vietnam war, and operated as numbers 1988 to 1997 by the US Army. After the end of the Vietnam war in 1975 the class were renumbered as D10H numbers 31 to 40 by the Vietnam Railways.

Several similar units were operated in the USA by industrial operators, as well as MBTA and BART. A higher weight class, the CR-8XT, was operated by companies including Bethlehem Steel and the Jones and Laughlin Steel Company.

Notes

References

Diesel-hydraulic locomotives
Military equipment of the Vietnam War
Diesel locomotives of Vietnam
Metre gauge diesel locomotives
5 ft 6 in gauge locomotives
Railway locomotives introduced in 1963